The U.S. Senate Environment and Public Works Subcommittee on Public Sector Solutions to Global Warming, Oversight, Children's Health Protection was one of the six subcommittees of the U.S. Senate Committee on Environment and Public Works.  Created in 2007, the subcommittee has general oversight jurisdiction over the U.S. Environmental Protection Agency as well as diverse issues such as global warming, children's health protection, and the National Environmental Policy Act (NEPA).

Members, 110th Congress

See also

U.S. Climate Change Science Program

External links
Official site

2007 establishments in Washington, D.C.
2007 in the environment
Environment of the United States
Environment and Public Works Public Sector Solutions to Global Warming, Oversight, and Children's Health Protection